Roughing is an offense and penalty in ice hockey when two players are in a minor altercation. The incident would have to be minor for either player to be categorized as such an offense, for instance:

 A player striking another opponent
 A goalie using their equipment to punch an opponent

In broader sports terminology it is also used in penalty calls given in American, or gridiron football, although the calls usually include the position against which the infraction was committed.

 Roughing the passer, when the quarterback is hit and the hit is deemed to be intentional and not the result of incidental or unavoidable contact.
 Roughing the kicker, when a kicker is intentionally hit well after the ball has been kicked away.

References
 Rule 84

Ice hockey rules
Ice hockey terminology
Ice hockey penalties
Violence in ice hockey
Terminology used in multiple sports